Phat phrik khing or pad prik king is a type of Thai curry that is drier than other Thai curries such as red curry as it is fried in oil and does not contain liquid coconut milk. Sometimes, instead of, or in addition to frying oil, coconut milk is heated until it turns to oil for added taste.

The paste is a thick curry presenting a vivid red color due to phrik (chili peppers). Confusingly, the Thai name indicates that ginger (khing) is used in this dish, which in fact is not the case. Recipes for the phrik khing curry paste usually include lemongrass, garlic and galangal. Very often, also in Thailand, red curry paste is used instead.

See also 

 Thai curry
 Phat khing

References 

Thai curries
Spicy foods